is a private university in Kobe, Hyōgo, Japan.

It was established in 1989 by Tanioka Gakuen Educational Foundation (founded in 1928), which runs several schools such as Osaka University of Commerce.

Undergraduate schools 
 School of Progressive Arts
 Department of Media Arts
 Department of Plastic Arts
 School of Design
 Department of Visual Design
 Department of Fashion and Textile Design
 Department of Product Design
 Department of Environmental Design

Graduate schools 
 Integrated Arts Division (Master's courses)
 Integrated Design Division (Master's courses)
 Arts and Design Division (Doctoral courses)

Notable alumni
 Kiyohiko Azuma - manga artist
 Keiichi Okabe - video game composer
 Yoko Taro - video game director

External links 
* 
 Tanioka Gakuen Educational Foundation

Educational institutions established in 1928
Private universities and colleges in Japan
Universities and colleges in Hyōgo Prefecture
Engineering universities and colleges in Japan
1928 establishments in Japan